Devon John Mathis (born September 21, 1982) is an American politician serving as a member of the California State Assembly from the newly drawn 33rd District, which is located in Kings County, western Tulare County, and a small part of southern Fresno County. He serves as the Caucus Operations Chair for the California State Assembly Republican Caucus.

Early life and education 
Mathis was born in Porterville, California. He earned an Associate of Arts degree in Social Sciences from Porterville College and Bachelor of Arts in Public Administration from California State University, Fresno. Mathis graduated from George Washington University earning a Master of Professional Studies in Strategic Public Relations in 2021.

Career 
Before joining the Assembly, Devon served for 10 years as a Sergeant in the Army National Guard, including two tours in Iraq. During his second tour in Iraq, Devon was severely injured in a roadside bomb attack, for which he was awarded a Purple Heart.

In 2014, he unexpectedly defeated Woodlake Mayor Rudy Mendoza, a fellow Republican who was better known and had more support from established Republicans. Mendoza sought a rematch in 2016, but Mathis defeated him again in the primary. Mathis, who had no previous political experience, ran on his status as a former Army National Guard sergeant and veterans advocate.

In July 2017 Mathis, along with four other Republican assemblymen, voted "Yes" on AB 398 to extend California's Cap and Trade program.

In 2018, Mathis faced a serious Republican primary challenge, winning only 30% of the vote, narrowly defeating Republican Visalia Mayor Warren Gubler. But in the November runoff, he rallied and defeated Democratic Tulare City Councilman Jose Sigala with 58% of the vote.

Mathis was not seriously challenged in 2020 or in 2022.

Devon Mathis currently serves as the Vice Chair of the Assembly Committee on Agriculture  and the Vice Chair of the Assembly Committee on Water, Parks, and Wildlife. He also serves on the Assembly Committee on Appropriations, the Committee on Government Organization, the Committee on Military and Veteran Affairs, the Committee on Natural Resources, and the Utilities and Energy Committee.

To date, Mathis has successfully authored 17 bills and 15 resolutions that have been chaptered into state law; he is also listed as a joint author to 46 other measures and 9 other resolutions. Spanning his legislative career, Mathis has coauthored 139 bills and 954 resolutions that have been chaptered into law.

Personal life 
Devon lives in Porterville with his five children.

False Allegations of sexual assault
In October 2017 it was announced by the Sacramento Police Department that Mathis was being investigated for an alleged sexual assault against a female member of his staff. A conservative political blog, American Children First, reported that sources had informed them that Mathis and several staff members had gone out drinking and returned to the home of one of the staff members. There, it was alleged and later disproven, an inebriated female staff member had gone into a bedroom and passed out on the bed, and Mathis was alleged to have "digitally penetrated" her while she was unconscious.

Regarding the incident, Mathis' office released this statement: “We have a policy of not responding to unsubstantiated, random social media posts.” A spokesman for the Sacramento Police Department. said that “information of a possible sexual assault was brought to our attention. We are starting to follow up with the information we have." Following an investigation, none of the accusations were substantiated clearing Mathis of any wrongdoing regarding this event.

California Assembly officials required Mathis to take remedial sexual harassment training after a claim that he engaged in the utterance of coarse language (locker-room talk) and made sexual remarks about fellow lawmakers.

Elections

2014 California State Assembly

2016 California State Assembly

2018 California State Assembly

2020 California State Assembly

2022 California State Assembly

References

External links 
 
 Campaign website
A Bipartisan vote for climate action

Living people
People from Visalia, California
Republican Party members of the California State Assembly
21st-century American politicians
1982 births